This article lists the heads of the Sarajevo Canton, the head of the Government of the Sarajevo Canton.

Until 2002, both the offices of governor and prime minister existed. However, the office of governor of the Sarajevo Canton was abolished and the office of prime minister was left as the sole office. The prime minister is appointed by the Sarajevo Cantonal Assembly. As head of the government, the prime minister has no authority for appointing ministers, and his role is that of a coordinator. Ministers are appointed in his or her stead by the majority-parties according to ethnic and entity representation rules, so that a deputy minister must not be of same ethnicity as the respective minister.

Darja Softić-Kadenić is the current acting prime minister of the Sarajevo Canton. She took office on 25 January 2023.

Heads of the Sarajevo Canton (1996–present)

Governors

Prime Ministers

References

External links
World Statesmen - Sarajevo Canton

Sarajevo Canton